A general election was held in the U.S. state of Kentucky on November 5, 2019, with all executive offices in the state up for election. Primary elections were held on May 21, 2019.

Governor and Lieutenant Governor

The 2019 Kentucky gubernatorial election took place on November 5, 2019, to elect the governor and lieutenant governor of Kentucky. The Democratic nominee, Kentucky Attorney General Andy Beshear, defeated Republican incumbent Matt Bevin by a margin of just over 5,000 votes, or 0.37%.  It was the closest gubernatorial election in Kentucky since 1899 by total votes, and the closest ever by percentage.

Bevin won 97 counties, while Beshear won only 23 counties.  Beshear carried only two of the state's six congressional districts, but those districts were the state's two most urbanized, the Louisville-based 3rd and the Lexington-based 6th.

Bevin conceded on November 14, after a recanvass took place that day that did not change the vote count.  Libertarian John Hicks also qualified for the ballot and received 2% of the vote. Statewide turnout was just over 42%, much higher than for the 2015 gubernatorial election. The result was a major swing from 2016, when Donald Trump won the state by 30 points and Republicans gained a supermajority in both chambers of the Kentucky General Assembly.

Results

Attorney General

The 2019 Kentucky Attorney General election was conducted on November 5. Primary elections occurred on May 21, 2019. The general election was held on November 5, 2019. Incumbent Democratic Attorney General Andy Beshear declined to seek reelection to a second term to successfully run for Governor. Republican Daniel Cameron defeated Democrat Greg Stumbo. He became the first Republican attorney general of Kentucky since 1948, and the state's first black attorney general.

Results

Secretary of State

Incumbent Democratic Secretary of State Alison Lundergan Grimes was ineligible to run for a third term due to term limits. This was the only statewide race in Kentucky in 2019 besides the gubernatorial election in which the Democratic candidate came close to winning and the only non-gubernatorial statewide election in KY, LA or MS where the Democrat achieved more than 45% of the vote in 2019.

Democratic primary

Candidates
Jason Belcher, U.S. Air Force veteran and writer
Jason Griffith, teacher and businessman
Heather French Henry, former Commissioner of Veterans Affairs of Kentucky and former Miss America
Geoff Sebesta, comic book artist

Results

Republican primary

Candidates
Michael Adams, general counsel for the Republican Governors Association and former Mitch McConnell aide
Andrew English, former general counsel for the Kentucky Justice and Public Safety Cabinet and U.S. Navy veteran
Stephen Knipper, cyber security expert, former Erlanger city councilman, and nominee for Secretary of State in 2015
Carl Nett, former counterintelligence officer

Polling

Results

General election

Polling

Results

State Auditor

Republican primary

Candidates
Mike Harmon, incumbent State Auditor of Kentucky

Democratic primary

Candidates
Kelsey Hayes Coots, teacher
Sheri Donahue, former U.S. Navy engineer
Chris Tobe, pension consultant

Withdrew
Drew Curtis, founder of Fark and independent candidate for governor in 2015

Results

General election

Results

State Treasurer

Republican primary

Candidates
Allison Ball, incumbent State Treasurer of Kentucky

Democratic primary

Candidates
Michael Bowman, bank manager and former Louisville Metro Council staffer
Josh Mers, insurance agent and treasurer for the Lexington Human Rights Commission

Results

General election

Results

Agriculture Commissioner

Republican primary

Candidates
Bill Polyniak, farmer and hemp businessman
Ryan Quarles, incumbent Agriculture Commissioner of Kentucky

Polling

Results

Democratic primary

Candidates
Robert Haley Conway, district supervisor of the Scott County Soil and Water Conservation Board and former chair of the Scott County Board of Education
Joe Trigg, Glasgow city councilman

Results

General election

Results

Judiciary

Supreme Court

Candidates
Christopher Shea Nickell, Kentucky Court of Appeals judge for the 1st Appellate District, Division 1
Whitney Westerfield, member of the Kentucky Senate for the 3rd District and candidate for Attorney General in 2015

Results
Both candidates were registered Republicans, but the election was conducted under a non-partisan format.

Court of Appeals

Notes
Partisan clients

References

External links
Official campaign websites for Secretary of State 
 Michael Adams (R) for Secretary of State
 Heather French Henry (D) for Secretary of State 

Official campaign websites for Auditor
 Sheri Donahue (D) for Auditor
 Mike Harmon (R) for Auditor

Official campaign websites for Treasurer
 Allison Ball (R) for Treasurer
 Michael Bowman (D) for Treasurer

Official campaign websites for Agriculture Commissioner
 Robert Haley Conway (D) for Ag Commissioner
 Ryan Quarles (R) for Ag Commissioner

Official campaign websites for Supreme Court
 Whitney Westerfield for Supreme Court

 
Kentucky
November 2019 events in the United States